Hoker is a surname. Notable people with the surname include:

Robert Hoker (died 1537), English Member of Parliament for Exeter
John Hoker ( 1527–1601), English constitutionalist

See also
Eric D'Hoker (born 1956), Belgian-American theoretical physicist
Hooker (disambiguation)